Kikorongo, also Kikorongo Junctiom, is a settlement in Kasese District, in the Western Region of Uganda.

Location
The coordinates of Kikorongo are: 0°00'00.0"N, 29°59'55.0"E (Latitude:0.000005; Longitude:29.998618). As one can deduce from the latitude, the settlement sits directly at the Equator.

Points of interest
The Fort Portal–Kasese–Mpondwe Road joins the Kikorongo–Ishaka Road at Kikorongo.

See also
 Katunguru
 Fort Portal–Kasese–Mpondwe Road

References

External links
  Website of Kasese District Local Government

Populated places in Western Region, Uganda
Cities in the Great Rift Valley
Kasese District